The Embassy of Iceland in London is the diplomatic mission of Iceland in the United Kingdom.  It occupies a large, modern building designed by Danish architect Arne Jacobsen which it shares with the Embassy of Denmark, completed in 1977. There has been an Icelandic embassy in the UK since 1940.

Gallery

See also
Ambassador of Iceland to the United Kingdom

References

External links
Official site

Iceland
Diplomatic missions of Iceland
Iceland–United Kingdom relations
Buildings and structures in the Royal Borough of Kensington and Chelsea
Knightsbridge